Sámi soga lávlla (English: Song of the Sami Family/People) is the anthem of the Sámi people. The text was written by Isak Saba, and Arne Sørli composed the music. Originally a poem, it was first published in the Sámi newspaper Saǥai Muittalægje on 1 April 1906. Sámi soga lávlla has been translated into most of the Sámi languages.

History of the anthem

The poem Sámi soga lávlla was written by Norwegian Sámi Isak Saba. He was a Norwegian school teacher and a researcher of Sami folklore and politics from Unjárga. In 1906, he became the first Sami to be elected to the Norwegian Parliament (he was a deputy in 1906-1912). The poem was first published on 1 April 1906 on the Northern Sami in the Norwegian newspaper Sagai Muittalægje.

In August 1986, the 13th Sámi Conference, was held in the Swedish village of Åre, a poem Sámi soga lávlla was declared the national anthem of the Sami. The music written for these words were by the Norwegian composer Arne Sørli, was approved in 1992 as the official national anthem at the 15th Sámi Conference in Helsinki.

Lyrics

Lyrics in Sámi

Lyrics in other local languages

Translation into English

Notes

External links
MP3 of Sámi soga lávlla
Sagai Muittalægje article on Sámi soga lávlla

National anthems
Sámi music
European anthems
National anthem compositions in F major